Yoandy Garlobo Romay (born January 12, 1977 in Jovellanos, Matanzas Province, Cuba) is a baseball player who starred for Cuba at the 2006 World Baseball Classic. Garlobo was the designated hitter for Cuba at the tournament, where he had a .480 batting average—second only to Ken Griffey Jr. among players with at least 20 plate appearances—and was named to the all-tournament team.

In Cuba, Garlobo is the DH for Matanzas of the Cuban National Series. During the 2005-06 season, he had a .407 batting average.

References

1977 births
Living people
Cuban baseball players
2006 World Baseball Classic players

Central American and Caribbean Games gold medalists for Cuba
Competitors at the 2006 Central American and Caribbean Games
Central American and Caribbean Games medalists in baseball
People from Matanzas Province